
King's Cup (incl. translations), may refer to:

Sports

Football
 Copa del Rey, Spanish for "King's Cup," the main national knockout tournament in men's football
 King Cup (sometimes named King's Cup), Saudi Arabian men's football national knockout competition
 King's Cup (Bahrain), the premier national knockout football tournament
 King's Cup (Bhutan), former name for the Jigme Dorji Wangchuk Memorial Gold Cup, a football tournament
 King's Cup (Thailand), international tournament in Thailand

Watersports
 King's Cup (rowing), interstate men's eight race at the Australian Rowing Championships
 King's Cup (yachting), yachting race in New York
 Phuket King's Cup Regatta, Asian regatta in Thailand

Other sports
 AJC Kings Cup, former name of the Queen Elizabeth Stakes (ATC), a horse race held in Sydney, Australia
 Brand's Crossword Game King's Cup, Scrabble tournament held in Bangkok, Thailand
 King's Cup (air race), annual British handicapped cross-country air race
 King's Cup (golf), golf tournament on the Asian Tour
 King's Cup (horse race), former name (1927–1951) of Queen's Cup, an Australian horse race held annually in rotation in different states
 King's Cup (Muay Thai), annual tournament in Thailand
 King's Cup (rugby union), a tournament held in 1919 for World War I's Allied forces
 King's Cup (snooker), snooker competition held in Thailand
 King's Cup Elephant Polo, championship Elephant polo event in Thailand
 King's Cup Sepaktakraw World Championship, sepak takraw team event in Thailand

Other uses
 The King's Cup, a 1933 UK drama film
 Kings (drinking game), also known as King's Cup

See also 
 Copa del Rey (disambiguation)
 Coupe du Roi, a Spa24 title
 Cup (disambiguation)
 King (disambiguation)
 Kingcup or marsh marigold (Caltha palustris), a perennial herbaceous flowering marsh plant
 Queen's Cup (disambiguation)